Opus Casino (formerly Liquid Vegas, Royal Star, Liberty II, Liberty I, Royal Empress, Punta Pedrera) is a cruiseferry built in 1985 in Valencia, Spain for Marítima de Formentera SA, to handle traffic between Ibiza and Formentera. In July 2012, the vessel was donated to The Seasteading Institute, and is currently available for bareboat charter or sale, preferably to businesses that could support experimentation with long-term ocean habitation.

History
A 1986 incident required expensive repairs. In 1993, the vessel was sold to Helton Limited. In 1995, she was sold to Adventure Holdings Corp. (Kingstown) and commenced duty as a casino ship near Florida under the name Royal Empress. In 2004, she was sold to Royal Star.

In fall 2009, the vessel owner at the time, Las Vegas Casino Lines, LLC, declared bankruptcy and Liquid Vegas was sold at auction on October 29, 2009, by the Canaveral Port Authority.

The ship is currently classified through Registro Italiano Navale.

External links
 Fact sheet and deck plans - The Seasteading Institute
 Partial ship history until 2004 - Fakta om fartyg
 Professional photographs from shipspotting.com

References

Cruiseferries
1985 ships